The Humboldt Channel is a natural waterway through the central Canadian Arctic Archipelago in Kitikmeot Region, Nunavut. It separates King William Island (to the west) from the Tennent Islands (to the east). To the north the strait opens into the James Ross Strait; to the south it opens into the Rae Strait.

Channels of Kitikmeot Region